Tanner is an unincorporated community in Scott County, in the U.S. state of Missouri.

History
A post office called Tanner was established in 1923, and remained in operation until 1929. The community has the name of Samuel Tanner, an early settler.

References

External links
 Tanner, Scott County, Missouri on www.placenames.com

Unincorporated communities in Scott County, Missouri
Unincorporated communities in Missouri